Alice Moretti (19 June 1921 – 6 February 2022) was a Swiss politician. A member of the Free Democratic Party of Switzerland, she served on the Grand Council of Ticino from 1971 to 1987. 

Moretti died in Paradiso on 6 February 2022, at the age of 100.

References

1921 births
2022 deaths
20th-century Swiss politicians
Free Democratic Party of Switzerland politicians
Swiss centenarians
Women centenarians
People from Lugano District
20th-century Swiss women politicians